Goose Creek is a stream in Washington County in the U.S. state of Missouri. It is a tributary of Indian Creek.

Goose Creek most likely was so named on account of geese near its course.

See also
List of rivers of Missouri

References

Rivers of Washington County, Missouri
Rivers of Missouri